Harold Simon Miller (25 April 1941 - 16 December 1983) was a South African jazz double bassist, who lived for most of his adulthood in England.

Biography
A native of Cape Town, South Africa, Miller began his career playing bass for the rock group Manfred Mann. After settling in London, he became part of a groups of musicians in the 1960s and 1970s who combined free jazz with the music of South Africa. He recorded with Elton Dean, Chris McGregor, Louis Moholo, John Surman, Keith Tippett, and Mike Westbrook. At the end of the 1970s, he moved to the Netherlands for economic reasons and worked with musicians in Willem Breuker's circle. In 1971, he made a guest appearance on the album Islands, by the progressive rock band King Crimson. He and his wife founded Ogun Records.

Miller died in a car crash in the Netherlands in 1983.

Discography
 Children at Play (Ogun, 1974)
 Live at Willisau with Chris McGregor's Brotherhood of Breath (Ogun, 1974)
 Ramifications with  Irene Schweizer (Ogun, 1975)
 Family Affair (Ogun, 1977)
 In Conference (Ogun, 1978)
 Bracknell Breakdown  with Radu Malfatti (Ogun, 1978)
 Procession (Live at Toulouse) with Chris McGregor's Brotherhood of Breath (Ogun, 1978)
 The Nearer the Bone, the Sweeter the Meat with Peter Brötzmann (FMP, 1979)
 Opened, But Hardly Touched with Peter Brötzmann (FMP, 1981)
 Zwecknagel with Radu Malfatti (FMP, 1981)
 Berlin 'Bones with Andreas Boje, Thomas Wiedermann, Manfred Kussatz (FMP, 1981)
 Alarm with Peter Brötzmann (FMP, 1983)
 Travelling Somewhere with Chris McGregor's Brotherhood of Breath (Cuneiform, 2001)
 Bremen to Bridgwater with Chris McGregor's Brotherhood of Breath (Cuneiform, 2004)
 Which Way Now (Cuneiform, 2006)
 Eclipse at Dawn with Chris McGregor's Brotherhood Of Breath (Cuneiform, 2008)
 Full Steam Ahead (Reel, 2009)
 Ninesense Suite with Elton Dean (Jazzwerkstatt, 2011)
 The Birmingham Jazz Concert with Mike Osborne, Tony Levin (Cadillac, 2012)
 Different Times, Different Places (Ogun, 2013)
 Different Times, Different Places Volume Two (Ogun, 2016)

References

External links
 Ogun collection
 FMP releases

1941 births
1983 deaths
Jazz double-bassists
South African jazz musicians
Centipede (band) members
20th-century double-bassists
Brotherhood of Breath members
Ogun Records Artists